The Charles Ives Awards are scholarships for young composers, awarded annually by the American Academy of Arts and Letters: six scholarships of $7,500, and two fellowships of $15,000. In 1998, the Academy inaugurated the Charles Ives Living, a 2-year, $200,000 award, and in 2008 awarded the inaugural Charles Ives Opera Prize of $50,000.

Winners

References 

Awards established in 1970
American awards
Awards of the American Academy of Arts and Letters